1st Landing Support Battalion (1st LSB) is a logistics battalion in the United States Marine Corps that supports distributed maritime operations and expeditionary advanced base operations. The unit is based out of Marine Corps Base Camp Pendleton, California and falls under the command of the 1st Marine Logistics Group (1st MLG) and the I Marine Expeditionary Force.

Mission
Provide throughput support for I Marine Expeditionary Force and other Marine Air-Ground Task Force operations in order to enable the distribution of equipment, personnel, and supplies by air, ground, and sea.

Table of organization
  Headquarters & Service Company
 Landing Support Company
 Beach and Terminal Operations Company
 Landing Support Equipment Company

History
The battalion was originally commissioned during World War II as 1st Pioneer Battalion on February 7, 1942.

Unit awards
A unit citation or commendation is an award bestowed upon an organization for the action cited. Members of the unit who participated in said actions are allowed to wear on their uniforms the awarded unit citation. Awards and decorations of the United States Armed Forces have different categories: i.e. Service, Campaign, Unit, and Valor.  1st LSB has been presented with the following awards:

See also
 List of United States Marine Corps battalions
 Organization of the United States Marine Corps

References

External links
 

1stLSB